The 1927–28 season was Port Vale's ninth consecutive season of football (22nd overall) in the English Football League. They finished in ninth place, following three consecutive eighth-placed finishes in the previous campaigns. Vale were once again looking strong in the division, yet unable to find the consistency necessary to win promotion to the top-flight. Top scorer Wilf Kirkham managed 14 goals, a whole 27 short of his previous record-breaking tally. Still one of the most successful season's in their history, they would better this finish on only three occasions over the next 85 years.

Overview

Second Division
The pre-season saw the players enjoy an outing at Rhyl, which helped new signings Alf Bennett (Nottingham Forest), David Rollo (Blackburn Rovers), Alex Trotter (South Shields), and Robert Gillespie (Luton Town) settle in.

The season started terribly, with an opening day draw with Nottingham Forest followed by four consecutive defeats. The team was changed around, with new signing Rollo dropped from the starting eleven; this helped the Vale to turn things around with convincing wins over Bristol City and Swansea. Their third 4–0 away loss followed, and more injuries followed, along with cash offers from rival clubs for their best players. By mid-October a settled side was formed, and the "Valiants" defeated derby rivals Stoke 2–0 in front of a record 31,493 at the Victoria Ground. Going from strength to strength they travelled to Bloomfield Road and went from 1–0 down to 6–1 up within an amazing 25 minute spell. Three more victories followed until Christmas saw a downturn in form. Five consecutive post-Christmas defeats to four promotion candidates ended the Vale's promotion campaign. In February Wilf Kirkham was eventually rested, and replacement Stewart Littlewood bagged five in two games to end the run of poor results. Littlewood had previously scored seventy goals for the reserves in just over a season and brought the necessary firepower to help the club surge up the league. Manager Schofield had something of a headache in choosing either the out-of-form legend Kirkham or consistent Littlewood, and only added to the conundrum by signing Blackpool forward Bert Fishwick. Following defeats to doomed South Shields and to Chelsea at Stamford Bridge, they finished the season with six consecutive clean sheets, though only won three of these games.

They finished in ninth place with 44 points, almost in exactly the same spot they had finished for the past two seasons. The defence had tightened up, but the attack, and especially top-scorer Kirkham had been somewhat off the boil. This led to Jack Lowe, Sidney Blunt, and Alex Trotter all being handed free transfers; they left for Oldham Athletic, Shrewsbury Town, and Manchester Central respectively. Meanwhile, back-up keepers Matthews and Holdcroft were also released, the former went to Halifax Town; however the latter would eventually find himself an England international and FA Cup winner at Preston North End.

Finances
On the financial side, the directors wished to leave The Old Recreation Ground for new and bigger stadia, however attempts to move to the greyhound track at Sun Street were blocked by Stoke City, who claimed the Vale would be too close to them. Overall the club lost £1,051 on the season, with their income £1,155 lower than the previous campaign.

Cup competitions
In the FA Cup, Vale breezed past league rivals Barnsley and Third Division North New Brighton with two 3–0 home victories. Yet they came unstuck at Ewood Park, First Division Blackburn Rovers won 2–1 and would go on to win the final.

League table

Results
Port Vale's score comes first

Football League Second Division

Results by matchday

Matches

FA Cup

Player statistics

Appearances

Top scorers

Transfers

Transfers in

Transfers out

References
Specific

General

Port Vale F.C. seasons
Port Vale